Richard Anthony McKenzie (born April 15, 1971) is a former American football linebacker. An All-American linebacker in high school, McKenzie starred at Penn State and left the team after the 1992 season though a dominant linebacker and considered by some to be the best athlete on that year's football team, Mckenzie was  benched in the final bowl game  after discipline issues with Coach Joe Paterno. As his off-the-field issues scared off many NFL teams, McKenzie was not selected until the sixth round of the 1993 NFL Draft. After three years and only eight game appearances he left the NFL.

References 

1971 births
Living people
American football linebackers
Penn State Nittany Lions football players
Cleveland Browns players
Orlando Predators players
Chicago Rush players